Zebra Tower is an office building in Warsaw that was built between 2008 and 2010 at Rondo Jazdy Polskiej. It is located directly at the entrance of the Politechnika metro station.

Description 
The building has a two level underground car park which has spaces for 124 cars. The investor was the Austrian developer S + B Gruppe. Tenants of office space include Boston Consulting Group, Samsung, TFI Investors, PKO Bank Polski, Bank Millennium, Bankier.pl and Svenska Handelsbank. The tenants of the retail space in the basement (820m2) are Starbucks and Saint Honoré Bakery.

References 

Office buildings completed in 2010
Śródmieście, Warsaw